Challenger Point is a high mountain summit of the Crestones in the Sangre de Cristo Range of the Rocky Mountains of North America. The summit is on the northwest shoulder of Kit Carson Mountain, and is a subpeak of the latter. It was renamed in memory of the seven astronauts who died when the Space Shuttle Challenger disintegrated shortly after liftoff on January 28, 1986.

The Memorial
The proposal to name the summit Challenger Point was made by Colorado Springs resident Dennis Williams in 1986. The USGS Board of Geographic Names approved the application on April 9, 1987.

Local climber Alan Silverstein organized and led an expedition on the weekend of July 18, 1987 to place a  memorial plaque on the summit.The plaque reads:

CHALLENGER POINT, 14080+'
In Memory of the Crew of Shuttle Challenger
Seven who died accepting the risk,
expanding Mankind's horizons
January 28, 1986  Ad Astra Per Aspera

The Latin phrase "Ad Astra Per Aspera" translates as "To the stars through adversity."

Climbing
Trailhead: Willow Creek Trailhead,

See also

Columbia Point
List of mountain peaks of Colorado
List of Colorado fourteeners

References

External links

 

Mountains of Colorado
Mountains of Saguache County, Colorado
Rio Grande National Forest
Sangre de Cristo Mountains
Fourteeners of Colorado
North American 4000 m summits